Garry Van Den Berghe (born November 13, 1960 in La Rivière, Manitoba) is a Canadian curler from Winnipeg, Manitoba and now living in Vernon, British Columbia. He coached the Jason Gunnlaugson rink in 2020 and in 2020 he began coaching a Japanese women’s curling team.

Van Den Berghe had played second for Jeff Stoughton until 2006, and played lead for him in 1991. With Stoughton, he won five provincial championships (1991, 1996, 1999, 2000, 2006), two Briers (1996, 1999), a World Curling Championship in 1996 and a World Championship silver in 1999.

He started his career in 1986 playing lead for David Tonnellier and played in his first provincial in 1987 with the same team.

Personal life
Van Den Berghe is married and has two children. He is retired.

References

External links
 

1960 births
Living people
World curling champions
Brier champions
Curlers from British Columbia
Canadian curling coaches
Canadian male curlers
Canada Cup (curling) participants
Sportspeople from Vernon, British Columbia
Curlers from Winnipeg